Outer membrane protein G (OmpG)  is a porin, a channel proteins in the outer membrane of Gram-negative bacteria.

Escherichia coli OmpG forms a 14-stranded beta-barrel and in contrast to most porins, appears to function as a monomer. The central pore of OmpG is wider than other E. coli porins and it is speculated that it may form a non-specific channel for the transport of larger oligosaccharides.

References

Protein domains
Protein families
Outer membrane proteins